William Frederick Pattinson (1889–1970) was an Australian medical doctor and businessman, and chairman of Washington H. Soul Pattinson and Choiseul Investments. Pattinson was the eldest son of businessman Lewy Pattinson and grew up in Balmain.

After returning from World War I, Pattinson was encouraged to join the business in 1920 by his father and during his time oversaw significant expansion of the business.

References 

1889 births
1970 deaths
20th-century Australian businesspeople